A security thread is  a security feature of many banknotes to protect against counterfeiting, consisting of a thin ribbon that is threaded through the note's paper.

Usually, the ribbon runs vertically, and is "woven" into the paper, so that it at some places emerges on the front side and at the remaining places at the rear side of the paper. Usually, it is made of metal foil, but sometimes of plastic. Often, it has some text or numbers (e.g., the denomination) engraved. 

Threads are embedded within the paper fiber and can be completely invisible or have a star burst effect, where the thread appears to weave in and out of the paper when viewed from one side. However, when held up to the light, the thread will always appear as a solid line. Features can be built into the thread material e.g., microprinting on a transparent plastic  thread or adding materials so they fluoresce under ultraviolet light.
The thread is a difficult feature to counterfeit but some counterfeiters have been known to print a thin grey line or a thin line of varnish in the area of the thread.

Security threads can also be used as an anti-counterfeiting device in passports. They are generally made of plastic and contain microprinting.

References 

Banknotes
Money forgery
Currency production
National Security Agency